Oshchepkovo is a rural locality (a village) in Vereshchaginsky District, Perm Krai, Russia. The population was 37 as of 2010.

Geography 
Oshchepkovo is located 6 km southeast of Vereshchagino (the district's administrative centre) by road. Gudyri is the nearest rural locality.

References 

Rural localities in Vereshchaginsky District